Al-Adani is a sub-district located in Dhi al-Sufal District, Ibb Governorate, Yemen. Al-Adani had a population of 10,495 as of 2004.

References 

Sub-districts in Dhi As Sufal District